This is a list of Etruscan names for Greek heroes. It is a partial list of the names in the list of Etruscan mythological figures.

Names

See also
 List of Etruscan mythological figures
 List of Greek mythological figures

Notes

References

  Preview available on Google Books.
  Preview available on Google Books.
 Available in the Gazetteer of Bill Thayer's Website at 

  Preview Google Books.
  A German-language book, downloadable from Google Books.

Etruscan mythology
Greek mythology-related lists